The Iron Age Greek migrations were effected by a population of émigrés from amidst the displacements and reconstruction that occurred in Greece proper from the middle of the 11th century to the end of the 9th century BCE (the Greek Dark Ages). The movements resulted in the settlement of the Aegean islands, Cyprus, Crete and the western coast of Asia Minor and the founding of new cities, which afterwards became centers of the Greek civilization. The migrations by various tribal groups were effected in consecutive waves known as the Aeolic, Ionian, Doric and Achaean (Arcadian) migrations. The movements differed from the Greek colonisation of the Archaic period in that they were more ad hoc affairs, rather than being the result of a planned process of colonisation on the part of the mother city. They are also less well-documented historically and in folk histories are often said to have been led by a mythologized or semi-legendary leader, such as Hercules or Orestes.

Movements within mainland Greece

The establishment of the Dorians within Central Greece 
Within the span of the 13th century BCE the Dorians, in all probability transplanted from the regions of Epirus and southern Macedonia, were moving farther south and exerting strong rule in the area of Central Greece with its centre of power in Doris. The Dorians who displaced the previous inhabitants of Southern Greece knew ironworking and there grew rapidly a great power in the hill country of Central Greece, out of which afterwards the Dorians which will have of necessity expanded southward into the regions which were inhabited in historical times by the Aetolians and the Locrians. In acquiring the region they displaced the previous inhabitants, the Dryopes, who fled to Euboea, to the islands of the Cyclades and to southern Argolis. In Euboea they set up a state, with its seat in Carystus while in southern Argolis they founded the cities of Hermione, Asine, Heiones and Mases. This movement of the Drupones was the first meaningful one in the region of Southern Greece in the shift from the Bronze Age to the Iron Age.

The Dorian Invasion of the Peloponnese 

After their consolidation in the area of Stereas the Dorians organized a campaign against the wealthy and powerful kings of Achaea in the Peloponnese. They were joined in their campaign by two neighboring tribes, the Aetolians and the Boeotians who either simply fought alongside the Dorians or else found themselves under their authority in that period. In the middle of the 12th century BCE, the Dorians attacked the Peloponnese, crossing Strait of Rion with their fleet. According to the tradition they crossed into the Peloponnese at the narrows of Rion-Antirion, and from that arrival (by naus, "ship"), the city of Naupactus (modern pronunciation Nafpaktos) took its name.

After their crossing into the Peloponnese, the Dorians split into four divisions and each of these moved to capture one of the principal Achaean kingdoms. One group under the leadership of Cresphontes moved on Messenia and captured the kingdom of Pylos. A second group under the leadership of Aristodemus moved on Laconia and established itself in Sparta, while the third under the leadership of Temenos took Argos and Mycenae. It is  calculated that the destruction of Mycenae by the invasion of the Dorians occurred around 1150 BCE. Finally, a fourth group under the leadership of Aletes, son of Hippotes moved on the isthmus of Corinth and took the area around Corinth.

The dominance of the Dorians in the Peloponnese brought further upheavals and changes in population. The Achaeans of Argolis moved northward and established themselves in the region of Achaea. From that region they displaced the Ionians who were administering it, and subsequently moved east from the region of Corinth. First establishing themselves in Euboea, displacing the previous inhabitants there, the Abantes and continued on to the Aegean and the coast of Asia Minor. The Ionians of Attica were able to repulse the invasion of the Dorians, as evidenced by the continuity of their kingship of Codrus morphing into the archonship (or kingship) of his son Medon.

The settlement of Asia Minor and the Aegean

Aeolian migration

In the same period that the Dorians moved on the Peloponnese, others carried out their own movements within Greece proper. The Thessalians, from their first appearance in the area of Thesprotia, moved into the area of Thessaly, displacing the earlier Aeolophone tribe who inhabited that area.
 Among these tribes who lived in Thessaly before the establishment of the Thessalians were the Boeotians, who moved southward and established the area of Boeotia. Other populations of Thessaly and the previous inhabitants of Boeotia fled to the region of the Northeast Aegean after the loss of their territories and established themselves first in Lesbos and Tenedos and the Moschonesi (Fragrant Isles). These inhabitants were later called Aeolians from the name of a Thessalic tribe who had taken part in the migration. The Aeolians next colonised the opposite shore of Asia Minor, which was named Aeolis. Herodotus relates the founding of twelve cities in that section of Asia Minor. They were as follows:Aegae, Aegiroessa, Gryneion, Cilla, Cyme, Larissa,  Myrina, Neonteichos, Notion, Pitane, Smyrna and Temnus. In the 7th century BCE, the Aeolians also expanded into the Troad, founding the cities of Gargara Assos, Antandros, Cebre, Scepsis, Neandreia and Pitya. The Achaeans of the Peloponnese who followed the Aeolic speakers participated in the Aeolic resettlement. The received tradition records Orestes as an instigator of the relocation of the Aeolians, and the royal family of the Penthilides on Mytilene claimed descent from Orestes.

Ionian migration

The Ionians, before the arrival of the Dorians, lived in the northern Peloponnese, in Megaris, and in Attica. After the loss of their territories to the Dorians and Achaeans of Argolis, they moved farther east and were situated at first in Euboea, displacing the earlier inhabitants, the Abantes. In the middle of the eleventh century BCE they settled the northern Cyclades and, together with the Ionians of Attica, settled the islands of Samos and Chios and the central section of the Asia Minor coast is named after them Ionia. The Ionians founded twelve cities which maintained tribal ties and remained united in one common polity, the Ionian League. The cities of the league were Miletus, Myus, Priene, Ephesus, Colophon, Lebedus, Teos, Clazomenae, Erythrae, Phocaea and the island states Chios and Samos. A temple of Poseidon, in the area of Mycale, ended up being their religious centre. Other tribes such as the Achaeans of the Peloponnese, the Arcadians, the Abantai, the Minyes from Orchomenus, the Phocaeans and the Molossians established themselves apart from the Ionians, but in the area of Ionia. The Abantes established themselves in Chios and preceded the Ionians who established themselves there later. The settlement of the Achaeans from Pylia is related to that at Colophon, while Achaeans from Argolis were established in the area of Clazomenai. The further traditions of the Ionian cities are thought to be due to the leader of the migration being one of the descendants of Codrus, and their point of departure appears to have been Attica.

Dorian migration

The Dorians who took Argos and Corinth expanded gradually throughout the northeast Peloponnese. After the failure to capture Attica, they turned toward the sea. With the Doric states of Argolis as their departure point they settled Aegina, the southern Cyclades, Cyprus, Crete, the Dodecanese and the southwestern coast of Asia Minor. Composed of various groups of Dorians from Troezen, they settled Halicarnassus; from Epidaurus, Cos, and from Argos, Rhodes, Crete, and the islands of the Cyclades. In the following years Dorians from Laconia also set up in Crete, on Thera (modern Santorini), on Milos and on Cnidus. The Dorian settlers of the regions of the Dodecanese and southwest Asia Minor joined in one form of common government, the Hexapolis, which encompassed the cities of Halicarnassus, Cnidus, Lindos, Ialysos, Camerius and Cos. The centre of the Dorians of Asia Minor was the temple of Apollo on the promontory of Triopios in Cnidus. Eventually the Halicarnassians were forbidden to participate in the ceremonies there, due to the sacrilege of one Agasicles.

Sources

References

Greek colonization
Ancient Greece